Jordan Lund (born May 7, 1957) is an American stage, film and television character actor.

Lund was born in Long Island, New York, the son of Miriam (née Cohen) and Marvin Lund.<ref> He received his training as an actor at Carnegie Mellon School of Drama. He was a member of the Estelle Parsons directed Shakespeare repertory company in residence at the Belasco Theatre on Broadway, produced by Joseph Papp and The Public Theater. 
He's also appeared several times at the Delacorte Theatre in Central Park for Shakespeare in the Park.

Selected filmography 

 1974 Lenny as Nightclub Customer (uncredited)
 1989 Lonesome Dove (TV Mini-Series) as Hutto
 1989 Jacknife as 'Tiny'
 1989 Fletch Lives as Deputy Sheriff
 1989 She's Back as 'Meathook'
 1989 Lock Up as Guard Manly
 1990 Framed (TV Movie) as Guard At Shane Estate
 1990 The Adventures of Ford Fairlane as Amiable Tourist
 1990 The Rookie as The Bartender
 1991 Doc Hollywood (1991) as John Crawford / Butcher
 1991 Harley Davidson and the Marlboro Man as Guard
 1991 Star Trek: The Next Generation (TV Series) as Kluge
 1990-1992 Life Goes On (TV Series) as Henry Muckerman
 1992 Cruel Doubt (TV Mini-Series) as Officer Edwards
 1992 Love Is Like That as Mr. Cook
 1993 Amos & Andrew as Riley
 1993 Star Trek: Deep Space Nine (TV Series) as Woban
 1994 The Stand (TV Mini-Series) as Bill Hapscomb
 1994 L.A. Law (TV Series) as Detective Mark Matosian
 1994 Speed as Bagwell
 1994 Alien Nation: Dark Horizon (TV Movie) as 'Moe' Goodluck
 1995 Species as Aide
 1995 The American President as Carl
 1995 Goldilocks and the Three Bears as Mayor
 1995-1997 Law & Order (TV Series) as Laramy / Lester Bishop
 1996 Before and After as Bailiff (uncredited)
 1996 Ghosts of Mississippi as Deputy
 1997 Chicago Hope (TV Series) as Leonard Mankiewicz
 1997 In Dark Places as Bald Man
 1998 Prey (TV Series) as Willis / Martin
 1998-1999 Seven Days (TV Series) as Press Secretary
 1999 The Practice (TV Series) as Officer
 1999 Life as Funeral Chaplain
 1999 Crazy in Alabama as Bridge Patrolman #1 (uncredited)
 1999 The Story of Us as Clergyman
 2000 The Visit as Photographer
 2000 More Dogs Than Bones as Detective Lund
 2000 Beautiful as Detective
 2001 ER (TV Series) as Carl Finkley (uncredited)
 2002 NYPD Blue (TV Series) as Captain Robert Lane
 2003 Frasier (TV Series) as Team Leader Ronnie
 2003 Star Trek: Enterprise (TV Series) as Skalaar
 2003 Alex & Emma as Claude
 2005 Rumor Has It... as Charity Dinner Guests
 2007 Without a Trace (TV Series) as Russell Beeman
 2007 The Bucket List as Tattoo Artist
 2010 Law & Order: Criminal Intent (TV series) as Marvin
 2011 Good Luck Charlie (TV sitcom) as Jeremiah
 2011 Life at the Resort as Pierre
 2012 Awake (TV Series) as Dr. Arthur Taylor

References

External links
Official website

 
 

1957 births
American male film actors
American male stage actors
American male television actors
Male actors from New York (state)
Living people
People from Long Island
20th-century American male actors
21st-century American male actors